There are at least 149 named mountains in Lewis and Clark County, Montana.
 Allan Mountain, el. 
 Anaconda Hill, el. 
 Angle Point, el. 
 Ayres Peak, el. 
 Bald Butte, el. 
 Baldy Mountain, el. 
 Baldy Mountain, el. 
 Bear Den Mountain, el. 
 Beartooth Mountain, el. 
 Black Butte, el. 
 Black Mountain, el. 
 Black Mountain, el. 
 Black Rock, el. 
 Blowout Mountain, el. 
 Brewer Hill, el. 
 Bunyan Point, el. 
 Burn Top Mountain, el. 
 Butcher Mountain, el. 
 Candle Mountain, el. 
 Canyon Point, el. 
 Cap Mountain, el. 
 Carey Butte, el. 
 Caribou Peak, el. 
 Cemetery Hill, el. 
 Cigarette Rock, el. 
 Coburn Mountain, el. 
 Colorado Mountain, el. 
 Comb Rock, el. 
 Concord Mountain, el. 
 Copper Butte, el. 
 Crater Mountain, el. 
 Crown Mountain, el. 
 Cyanide Mountain, el. 
 Dalton Mountain, el. 
 Danaher Mountain, el. 
 Deadman Hill, el. 
 Denton Mountain, el. 
 Devils Tower, el. 
 Dreadnaught Hill, el. 
 Drumlummon Hill, el. 
 Edward Mountain, el. 
 Electric Mountain, el. 
 Elephant Head, el. 
 Elephant Mountain, el. 
 Evans Peak, el. 
 Fairview Mountain, el. 
 Falls Point, el. 
 Flint Mountain, el. 
 French Bar Mountain, el. 
 Galusha Peak, el. 
 Gilman Hill, el. 
 Gobblers Knob, el. 
 Goon Hill, el. 
 Granite Butte, el. 
 Grassy Hills, el. 
 Green Mountain, el. 
 Greenhorn Mountain, el. 
 Hahn Peak, el. 
 Halfmoon Peak, el. 
 Haystack Butte, el. 
 Hedges Mountain, el. 
 Hogback Mountain, el. 
 Horse Mountain, el. 
 Jackson Peak, el. 
 Joes Mountain, el. 
 Johnson Mountain, el. 
 Junction Mountain, el. 
 Kevan Mountain, el. 
 Lannigan Mountain, el. 
 Lee Mountain, el. 
 Lick Mountain, el. 
 Limekiln Mountain, el. 
 Lone Chief Mountain, el. 
 Lone Mountain, el. 
 Long Point, el. 
 Lookout Mountain, el. 
 Luttrell Peak, el. 
 McCarty Hill, el. 
 Meyer Hill, el. 
 Meyers Hill, el. 
 Middleman Mountain, el. 
 Midnight Hill, el. 
 Mitchell Mountain, el. 
 Monitor Mountain, el. 
 Moonlight Peak, el. 
 Moore Hill, el. 
 Moors Mountain, el. 
 Mount Ascension, el. 
 Mount Belmont, el. 
 Mount Helena, el. 
 Mount Rowe, el. 
 Observation Point, el. 
 Old Baldy Mountain, el. 
 Olson Peak, el. 
 Painted Hill, el. 
 Patrol Mountain, el. 
 Pyramid Peak, el. 
 Rabbit Butte, el. 
 Rattlesnake Mountain, el. 
 Red Butte, el. 
 Red Hill, el. 
 Red Mountain, el. 
 Red Mountain, el. 
 Red Mountain, el. 
 Red Slide Mountain, el. 
 Redhead Peak, el. 
 Renshaw Mountain, el. 
 Roberts Mountain, el. 
 Rogers Mountain, el. 
 Roost Hill, el. 
 Roundtop Mountain, el. 
 Sacajawea Mountain, el. 
 Sandy Butte, el. 
 Sawtooth Mountain, el. 
 Scapegoat Mountain, el. 
 Scarlet Mountain, el. 
 Scratchgravel Hills, el. 
 Sentinel Mountain, el. 
 Sheep Mountain, el. 
 Sheep Mountain, el. 
 Sheep Mountain, el. 
 Sheep Sheds, el. 
 Signal Mountain, el. 
 Silver King Mountain, el. 
 Slategoat Mountain, el. 
 Steamboat Mountain, el. 
 Stemwinder Hill, el. 
 Stonewall Mountain, el. 
 Stony Point, el. 
 Sugar Loaf, el. 
 Sugarloaf Mountain, el. 
 Sugarloaf Mountain, el. 
 Sun Butte, el. 
 Sunrise Hill, el. 
 Sunset Hill, el. 
 Sunset Mountain, el. 
 Table Mountain, el. 
 The Twin Sisters, el. 
 Three Sisters, el. 
 Timber Hill, el. 
 Toms Peak, el. 
 Trident Peaks, el. 
 Trinity Hill, el. 
 Twin Buttes, el. 
 Twin Peaks, el. 
 Ursus Hill, el. 
 War Eagle Hill, el. 
 Willow Mountain, el. 
 Wolf Creek Hill, el.

See also
 List of mountains in Montana
 List of mountain ranges in Montana

Notes

Lewis and Clark